The discography of Every Time I Die, an American metalcore band, consists of nine studio albums, two extended plays (EPs), two video albums and 15 music videos. Founded in Buffalo, New York in 1998, Every Time I Die was formed by vocalist Keith Buckley, guitarists Jordan Buckley (Keith's brother) and Andy Williams, bassist John McCarthy and drummer Mike "Ratboy" Novak. After releasing EP The Burial Plot Bidding War in 2000, the band replaced McCarthy with Aaron Ratajczak and released its debut full-length album Last Night in Town on Ferret Music in 2001. Stephen Micciche became the group's third bassist in 2001, performing on the band's second album Hot Damn! released in 2003.

Micciche left in 2005 and was briefly replaced by Kevin Falk, who performed on the band's third album Gutter Phenomenon. The 2005 release reached number 71 on the US Billboard 200. Chris Byrnes took Falk's place later in the year, who was later substituted for Keller Harbin for touring. The band released its first video album Shit Happens: The Life. The Stage. The Road. The DVD. in 2006. The group's fourth album (and their final release on Ferret Music), The Big Dirty, was released in 2007 and reached number 41 on the Billboard 200, as well as entering the UK Rock & Metal Albums Chart at number five. Josh Newton joined the band as Harvin's full-time replacement in 2007.

After signing with Epitaph Records earlier in the year, Every Time I Die released fifth album New Junk Aesthetic in September 2009, which again reached the top 50 of the Billboard 200. Shortly before the album's release, Novak left the band and was replaced by Ryan "Legs" Leger. The following year the band released its second video Shit Happens: The Series?, which features a series of web episodes and additional footage. Ex Lives followed in 2012, topping the Billboard Hard Rock Albums and UK Rock & Metal Albums charts. Micciche returned to the band for a second stint shortly before the album's release. 2014's From Parts Unknown reached number 22 on the Billboard 200.

In February 2015, Leger left the band and was replaced by Daniel Davison. Four-track EP Salem was issued later in the year, before the band's eighth studio album Low Teens was released in September 2016, topping the Billboard Hard Rock Albums chart and reaching number two on the Top Rock Albums chart.

Studio albums

Extended plays

Video albums

Music videos

References

External links
Every Time I Die official website
Every Time I Die discography at AllMusic
Every Time I Die discography at Discogs
Every Time I Die discography at MusicBrainz

Discographies of American artists
Post-hardcore group discographies
Heavy metal group discographies